Telecommunications in Saint Lucia include internet, radio, television, and mobile and landline phones.

Internet

Saint Lucia's country code top-level domain is .lc. Prior to the 21st century internet was available only by satellite.  As of 2000, there were 5 Internet service providers serving the country. 90% of the city population has an internet connection but rural villages are only rarely connected.  The internet is growing rapidly across the country however.

Telephone
As of 2008, approximately 90,000 landlines and 100,000 mobile cellular lines were in use.

Also as of 2008, the telephone system consisted of two parts:
 Domestic: System is automatically switched.
 International: Submarine fibre optic link with Martinique (France), Saint Vincent and the Grenadines and Barbados.

Saint Lucia is part of the North American Numbering Plan with an area code is 758, although original 809 area code numbers may still be used. Under the 809 area code, in 2020 there were a total of 241,000 phone connections with 203,000 of them being mobile connections.

Radio
Radio broadcast stations:
AM 2, FM 7 (plus 3 repeaters), shortwave 0 (1998), includes VQH-AM 660

Radios:
111,000 (1997)

Television
Television broadcast stations:
3 (of which two are commercial stations and one is a community antenna television or CATV channel) (1997)

Televisions:
100,000 (2005)

References

External links 
 
 Eastern Caribbean Telecommunications Authority (ECTEL)
 Saint Lucia, SubmarineCableMap.com

Saint Lucia
 
Saint Lucia